Peñaflor is one of 28 parishes (administrative divisions) in the municipality of Grado, within the province and autonomous community of Asturias, in northern Spain.

The population is 261.

Villages and hamlets
 Anzo
 Peñaflor
 Sestiello
 Vega de Anzo

References

Parishes in Grado